Mr. Death or Mr Death may refer to:

Death (personification)
Mr. Death (Band)
Fred A. Leuchter (born 1943), an author of forensic Holocaust denial material
Dennis Allen (criminal) (1951–1987), Australian drug dealer
Mr. Death: The Rise and Fall of Fred A. Leuchter, Jr.
"Mr. Death", a Hugo Award-nominated short story by Alix E. Harrow

See also
Dr. Death (disambiguation)